Benjamin John Hamer (born 20 November 1987) is an English professional footballer who plays as a goalkeeper for Championship side Watford.

Career

Early career
Hamer was born in Chard, Somerset, and is a Bristol City fan. His family moved to Germany at the age of 3 and, consequently, he is a fluent German speaker. However, when he was 8, his family came back to England. He attended Holyrood Community School in Chard which is near to his birthplace. His footballing ability led to a spell playing for Somerset at county level, where he was spotted by a Reading scout. He signed for Reading at the age of 15.

Reading

Loan to Crawley Town FC
Having risen through the youth academy at Reading, Hamer went on loan to Crawley Town for the 2006–07 season, where he missed just one league game and was named as Player of the Season.

Loans to Brentford
On 4 July 2007, Hamer signed a new one-year contract to keep him at Reading until the end of the 2007–08 season. He joined Brentford in an initial one-month loan deal on 11 August 2007, which was subsequently extended to 14 October 2007. Brentford re-signed Hamer in an emergency loan deal on 1 January 2008, following an injury to their first choice 'keeper, Simon Brown. On 28 January 2008, his loan was extended to the end of the 2007–08 season.

He signed a new one-year deal with Reading and returned to Brentford for a third loan spell on a season-long loan on 17 June, and was Andy Scott's first choice goalkeeper for the 2008–09 season, in which Brentford were champions of League Two. As well as winning a League Two Champions medal, Hamer also won the Puma Golden Glove award for League 2 having recorded 20 clean sheets within the season.

On 18 June 2009, Hamer signed a new two-year contract and was expected to jostle with Adam Federici for the Number 1 jersey. On 31 August, Hamer was loaned back to Brentford for a fourth spell with the Bees.

Loan to Exeter City
On 18 January 2011, Hamer joined League One side Exeter City on a three-month loan deal. Hamer made his Exeter City debut against Walsall on 22 January 2011.

Charlton Athletic

On 1 August 2011, Hamer joined Charlton Athletic on a three-year contract and was immediately handed the number one jersey. He made his debut on 23 August 2011 against his former club Reading in the League Cup first round and helped Charlton to a 2–1 win. After some initial nervous performances he cemented his place in the team, making crucial saves throughout Charlton's title winning League One campaign. He clinched promotion to the Championship with Chris Powell's side in April 2012, with a 1–0 win over Carlisle United and continued to play regularly for the Addicks during the 2012–13 season. A series of injuries resulted in hamer playing fewer matches in the 2013–14 season.

Leicester City
After several weeks of strong speculation about Hamer's move to Leicester City, it was finally confirmed on 22 May 2014, by Hamer himself on social media. Hamer says he made the move to the newly promoted Foxes for the chance to play Premier League football. He made his debut in a 1–0 defeat at home to Shrewsbury Town in a League Cup second round tie. Following an injury to Kasper Schmeichel whilst on international duty, Hamer made his Premier League debut on 13 September, putting in a very good performance and keeping a clean sheet as Leicester secured a 1–0 win at Stoke City, their first victory since returning to the Premier League.

He played his second game for Leicester against Premier League champions, Manchester City in a 1–0 home defeat on 13 December. After playing 7 games for Leicester, Hamer lost his place when on 6 January 2015, Leicester signed experienced goalkeeper Mark Schwarzer from Chelsea to help cover for the injured Kasper Schmeichel. In the 2016–17 season, Hamer started Leicester's sixth Champions League group game, giving him his Champions League debut. Leicester lost 5–0 to FC Porto.

Loan to Nottingham Forest
On 25 July 2015, Hamer joined Championship side Nottingham Forest on a season-long loan deal. However, he returned to Leicester on 4 August after the loan was cut short due to Nottingham Forest's financial issues.

Loan to Bristol City
On 11 August 2015, Hamer joined Championship side Bristol City on season-long loan deal. However, he returned to Leicester City on 17 November 2015 after making only five appearances for the club.

Huddersfield Town
On 1 June 2018, Huddersfield Town announced the signing of Hamer on a free transfer once his contract ended on 1 July. Huddersfield fans were not impressed when Hamer was named number 1 for the 2020–21 season but his performances have won over the fans.

Derby County (loan)
On 8 August 2019, Hamer joined Derby County on loan for the 2019–20 season as back up for Kelle Roos. He made his debut and kept a clean sheet in a 1–0 win at Scunthorpe United in the EFL Cup first round. On 30 November 2019, Hamer made his league debut and thereafter became first choice keeper.

Swansea City
On 15 January 2021, Hamer completed a permanent move to Swansea City, for an undisclosed fee. He signed an 18-month contract.

Watford
On 19 July 2022, Hamer joined Watford on a free transfer, signing a two-year contract.

Career statistics

Honours
Brentford
Football League Two: 2008–09

Charlton Athletic
Football League One: 2011–12

Individual
PFA Team of the Year: 2011–12 League One
Football League Two Golden Glove: 2008–09

References

External links

Ben Hamer profile at Charlton Athletic F.C.

1987 births
Living people
People from Chard, Somerset
Footballers from Somerset
English footballers
Association football goalkeepers
Reading F.C. players
Crawley Town F.C. players
Brentford F.C. players
Exeter City F.C. players
Charlton Athletic F.C. players
Leicester City F.C. players
Nottingham Forest F.C. players
Bristol City F.C. players
Huddersfield Town A.F.C. players
Swansea City A.F.C. players
Derby County F.C. players
Watford F.C. players
National League (English football) players
English Football League players
Premier League players
English expatriates in Germany